Matsumuraeses is a genus of moths belonging to the subfamily Olethreutinae of the family Tortricidae.

Species
Matsumuraeses acrocosma Diakonoff, 1971
Matsumuraeses azukivora (Matsumura, 1910)
Matsumuraeses capax Razowski & Yasuda, 1975
Matsumuraeses elpisma Diakonoff, 1972
Matsumuraeses falcana (Walsingham, 1900)
Matsumuraeses felix Diakonoff, 1972
Matsumuraeses melanaula (Meyrick, 1916)
Matsumuraeses ochreocervina (Walsingham, 1900)
Matsumuraeses patialaensis Rose & Pooni, 2003
Matsumuraeses phaseoli (Matsumura, 1900)
Matsumuraeses tetramorpha Diakonoff, 1972
Matsumuraeses trophiodes (Meyrick, 1908)
Matsumuraeses ussuriensis (Caradja, 1916)
Matsumuraeses vicina Kuznetzov, 1973
Matsumuraeses xantholoba Diakonoff, 1972

See also
List of Tortricidae genera

References

External links
tortricidae.com

Grapholitini
Tortricidae genera